Yattalunga may refer to:
 Yattalunga, New South Wales in the Central Coast region north of Sydney
 Yattalunga, South Australia in the City of Playford in the outer northeast of Adelaide